"Rare" is a song by American singer Selena Gomez from her third studio album of the same name (2020). It was released alongside the album as the third and final single off of its standard edition on January 10, 2020, by Interscope Records. The track was written by Gomez, Madison Love, Brett McLaughlin and its producers Sir Nolan and Simon Says. "Rare" is a pop and electropop song with lyrics exuding self-love and individuality. It peaked at number 30 on the US Billboard Hot 100. "Rare" was ranked as the 12th best song of the first half of 2020 by Billboard.

Background
"Rare" was developed in a writing session with producer Sir Nolan and songwriters Madison Love and Brett McLaughlin. The song was initially written for Gomez, however she declined, and the song was recorded by other artists. In 2018, Selena wanted the song for the album and received it through her label’s A&R. According to Nolan, Gomez added melodies and ad-libs to make it fit her perspective. Producer Simon Says co-produced "Rare" with Nolan stating: "Simon and I went through her vocal takes a million times, comped them, Melodyned them, and went over the timing a trillion times. When it's an artist this big, you don't want to take any risks."

The song was revealed in an Instagram Live by Gomez on August 15, 2018. Later that day, co-writer McLaughlin confirmed his involvement in the song. Gomez teased the song's lyrics in an interview with Elle in September 2018. The song was then teased in the Rare album trailer.

On February 28, 2020, the Alexander 23  Edit of "Rare" was released for digital download and streaming.

Composition
Musically, "Rare" is three minutes and forty seconds long and has been described as a pop and electropop song. In terms of music notation, "Rare" was composed using  common time in the key of C Mixolydian with a tempo of 115 beats per minute, following a chord progression of C–B♭. Gomez's vocal range spans from the low note of C4 to the high note of A5, giving the song one octave and five notes of range. Gomez spoke to Billboard about "Rare":

Chart performance
"Rare" debuted and peaked at number thirty on the US Billboard Hot 100 following the release of the parent album and its accompanying music video. It later peaked at number 17 on the Mainstream Top 40 chart following its release as a radio single. 

The song also peaked within the top 40 on charts in Canada, Australia, Ireland, New Zealand, the United Kingdom, and Scotland.

Music video
The BRTHR-directed music video, released on January 10, 2020, accompanied the song's and album's release. It features Gomez wandering in an ethereal world, laying on a spinning bed in a discotheque inspired room, and swimming in a pool. It was stated by Gomez that the music video was inspired by her philanthropic trip to Kenya months prior to the album release.

The dress Gomez wore in the video was designed by AADNEVIK.

Live performances
On February 24, 2020, Gomez performed the song for the first time at the Village Studio. This live version was released for digital download and streaming on March 6, 2020.

Track listing
 Album version
 "Rare" – 3:40
 Digital download – Alexander 23 edit

 "Rare" (Alexander 23 edit) – 3:48

 Digital download – Live from The Village Studio

 "Rare" (Live from The Village Studio) – 3:51

Awards and nominations

Credits and personnel 
Credits adapted from the liner notes of Rare.

Recording locations
 Recorded at Home Away From Home Studios (Los Angeles, California)
 Mixed at Mirrorball Studios (North Hollywood, California)
 Mastered at Sterling Sound (New York City)

Personnel

 Selena Gomez – lead vocals, backing vocals, songwriting
 Madison Love – songwriting, backing vocals 
 Brett McLaughlin – songwriting
 Sir Nolan – songwriting, production, vocal production, engineering, instrumentation
 Simon Says – songwriting, production, vocal production, engineering, instrumentation
 Bart Schoudel – engineering
 Benjamin Rice – engineering
 Jake Faun – instrumentation
 Tony Maserati – mixing
 Miles Comaskey – mix engineering
 Chris Gehringer – mastering

Charts

Certifications

Release history

References

2020 singles
2020 songs
Electropop songs
Selena Gomez songs
Songs written by Selena Gomez
Songs written by Madison Love
Songs written by Sir Nolan